Ricardo Weslei de Campelo, also known as Ricardinho (born 19 November 1983 in Birigüi, São Paulo) is a Brazilian footballer.

Melbourne Victory
On 19 August 2010, Ricardinho was officially unveiled as Melbourne Victory's international marquee player, where he signed a two-year deal and was handed the number 9 shirt. Melbourne's signing of Ricardinho came at a time when the club was short of strikers, having sold Danny Allsopp and with Archie Thompson sidelined with a long-term injury. Ricardinho debuted off the bench for Melbourne in a 2–0 loss against Central Coast Mariners on 3 September 2010. On 12 September 2010, on his full debut with Melbourne Victory, Ricardinho scored his first goal in a 3–0 win at home to Brisbane Roar.

Ricardinho was not selected as one of the five foreign imports for Melbournes 2011 Asian Champions League campaign, and as a result was loaned to Campeonato Brasileiro Série B club Paraná Clube back in his home country of Brazil.

On 21 August 2011, Melbourne Victory announced its intention to release Ricardinho from his contract after his loan spell with Paraná Clube expired.

References

External links
 Melbourne Victory profile

1983 births
Brazilian footballers
Association football forwards
Living people
K League 1 players
Marília Atlético Clube players
Club Athletico Paranaense players
Fortaleza Esporte Clube players
Ipatinga Futebol Clube players
Paraná Clube players
Associação Ferroviária de Esportes players
Oeste Futebol Clube players
Jeju United FC players
Melbourne Victory FC players
Expatriate footballers in South Korea
Expatriate soccer players in Australia
Brazilian expatriate footballers
Brazilian expatriate sportspeople in South Korea
Marquee players (A-League Men)
Footballers from São Paulo